Hesar-e Valiyeasr Rural District is a rural district (dehestan) in Central District, Avaj County, Qazvin Province, Iran. At the 2006 census, its population was 9,050, in 2,177 families.  The rural district has 27 villages.

References 

Rural Districts of Qazvin Province
Avaj County